"Are 'Friends' Electric?" is a 1979 song by the English band Tubeway Army. Taken from their album Replicas, it was released as a single in May 1979 and reached number one in the UK Singles Chart, staying there for four weeks. It was written and produced by Gary Numan, the band's frontman and lead vocalist. It was also the band's last single before breaking up.

Music and production
"Are 'Friends' Electric?" was originally written on an old out-of-tune pub piano. It was initially two different songs that were combined. Numan recorded it on a Polymoog synthesizer with conventional bass and drums.

The song features three different sections: a recurring "verse" with a synth riff in C and B flat, a recurring section with spoken word over slow arpeggiated seventh chords, and an instrumental break in F. The instrumentation is quite minimal: a conventional drum and bass guitar backing track, some additional heavily flanged guitar (particularly in the instrumental break), subdued vocals and, most prominently, Minimoog and Polymoog synthesisers. These synth parts include portamento background lines.

Numan stumbled upon synthesisers by accident.  While intending to record a punk album, he noticed a Minimoog synthesiser that had been left in the studio.

In a 2014 interview with The Guardian, Numan commented on the song's lyrics;

Release
"Are 'Friends' Electric?" was released as a limited edition picture disc of 20,000 copies in May 1979. The B-side of the single was a more rock-oriented number, "We Are So Fragile". A song that was performed on Numan's 1979 "Touring Principle" series of concerts and appears on the album Living Ornaments '79. The song was covered by bis on the compilation album Random.

The single entered the lower reaches of the UK Singles Chart at a modest No. 71, steadily climbing to No. 1 at the end of June and remained on that position for four consecutive weeks.

Reception
Despite being over five minutes long and possessing, in the words of its composer, "no recognisable hook-line whatsoever", the single topped the UK charts in mid-1979. Whilst the track's distinctive sound stood out at the time, sales also benefited from the record company's use of a picture disc and Numan's striking, "robotic" performance on the TV shows The Old Grey Whistle Test and Top of the Pops.

Writing for Smash Hits in 1979, Cliff White described the song as "a dark, threatening wall of synthesised sound" which "throbbed ominously behind a gloomy song of paranoia and loneliness". White went on to say it was "gripping stuff, but cheerful it isn't".

The song has retrospectively been described as "an atmospheric, almost frigid-sounding monologue spliced over creepy after-dark synthesizers" that "had not a hook or chorus in sight".

Live versions
"Are 'Friends' Electric?" has been a mainstay of Numan's concerts since its release and appears on all ten of his official live recordings to date. A semi-acoustic version appeared on the 2006 Jagged tour set list.

Track listing

Personnel
Tubeway Army
 Gary Numan – Minimoog and Polymoog synthesizers, guitar, vocals
 Paul Gardiner – bass guitar
 Jess Lidyard – drums

Production
 Gary Numan – production

Charts and certifications

Weekly charts

Year-end charts

Certifications

Sampling and cover versions

The song was sampled by Richard X in a song titled "We Don't Give a Damn About Our Friends" as a mashup with vocals from Adina Howard's "Freak like Me", which the Sugababes then recorded under the latter title and achieved a number one UK hit in 2002 (Numan considered this track to be better than "Are 'Friends' Electric?"). It was also covered by Information Society on their 1997 album Don't Be Afraid, and The Dead Weather for their B-side of "Hang You from the Heavens".

The song was covered by American rock band Weezer and released alongside their 2008 single, "Pork and Beans". "Are 'Friends' Electric?" was featured in the video game Need for Speed: Carbon, JJ Abram's Fringe, and the AMC Television show Halt and Catch Fire. The song was also sampled by Kryder and The Cube Guys in their 2016 single, "You & Me". In 2018, Kevin Max covered the song for his concept album Romeo Drive.

In popular culture
The song was featured in the 2006 video game Need for Speed: Carbon. It plays whenever the player is using a car in the tuner class. In IO Interactive's Hitman, the mission 'Club 27' has a reference in the form of an Objective of the same name.

Song used near the beginning and near the end of the 2022 Netflix movie, Choose or Die

References

1979 singles
1979 songs
Beggars Banquet Records singles
Science fiction music
Songs about prostitutes
Songs about robots
Songs written by Gary Numan
Tubeway Army songs
UK Singles Chart number-one singles